Phobetron is a genus of slug caterpillar moths in the family Limacodidae. There are at least four described species in Phobetron, found in North, Central, and South America.

Species
These four species belong to the genus Phobetron:
 Phobetron cypris
 Phobetron dyari Barnes & Benjamin, 1926
 Phobetron hipparchia Cramer, 1777
 Phobetron pithecium (J. E. Smith) (hag moth)

References

Further reading

 

Limacodidae